Schoofs Nunatak is an isolated nunatak 20 nautical miles (37 km) west-northwest of Mount Barkow, rising above the featureless ice plateau westward of the heads of Meinardus and Haines Glaciers, in Palmer Land. Mapped by United States Geological Survey (USGS) from surveys and U.S. Navy air photos, 1961–67. Named by Advisory Committee on Antarctic Names (US-ACAN) for Gerald J. Schoofs, radioscience researcher at Byrd Station, summer 1965–66.

Nunataks of Palmer Land